Richmond Police Department may refer to:

 Richmond Police Department (California), in Richmond, California, US
 Richmond Police Department (Virginia), in Richmond, Virginia, US